Giovanni Rotondo is a London-based composer. He has composed music for feature films, documentaries and TV series, including the Netflix show Dark Desire.

Education 
Rotondo completed his bachelor degree in music composition at Berklee College of Music in Boston.

Career 
After completing his bachelor, he spent a year in Los Angeles. During this time, he worked on Spider-man 3, and the Irish drama film Calvary. He  also collaborated on the score of The Ramen Girl, and Illegal Tender.

He created and managed the Film Scoring Lab at Centro Sperimentale di Cinematografia. After scoring the feature film Bologna 2 Agosto I Giorni Della Collera, he composed the music for Orphans & Kingdoms, a 2014 New Zealand drama. He composed themes for Elijah and the Rock Creature, a 2018 Canadian movie. Other TV projects he composed for include: Il Giudice Meschino*, Il Confine, Dark Desire, and The Nightriders.

Music composition for video games 

 The 8-bit Time Machine
 Zotrix

Awards 
Rotondo has been nominated and the won following awards.
Global Music Award: Silver Medal for Orphans & Kingdoms, original soundtrack film
Global Music Award 2018: for Elijah and the Rock Creature, original score
International Sound & Film Music Festival nominated for Il Confine
Global Music Award in 2013
Jerry Goldsmith Awards in 2014

References 

Year of birth missing (living people)
Place of birth missing (living people)
Male composers
British film score composers
Living people